The Japanese Lighthouse is an abandoned lighthouse situated atop Navy Hill in Garapan, Saipan, in the Northern Mariana Islands. It was listed on the National Register of Historic Places in 1974. The lighthouse is one of the few surviving pre-World War II, civilian structures built by the Japanese.

Design 
The Japanese Lighthouse is an approximately  white concrete tower with an attached to a one-story lighthouse keeper's quarters. The concrete used in the construction of the lighthouse was produced from burnt coral and seashells, but weathers easily.

History 
The lighthouse was constructed in 1934 to assist ships navigating into Tanapag Harbor on the western coast of Saipan. At the time, Saipan was governed by the Empire of Japan as part of its South Seas Mandate. The lighthouse was in operation until 1944 when it sustained damage from an American naval bombardment in the Battle of Saipan. During the war, the lighthouse was never rebuilt and, after the war, remained abandoned. The copper dome, however, was removed and put into storage. The Japanese Lighthouse was listed on the National Register of Historic Places on December 19, 1974.

In 1990, the lighthouse was renovated and expanded to be used as a restaurant; the dome was returned to the top of the tower not long after. The restaurant was closed in 1994 to 1995. The graffiti-covered lighthouse was repainted in 2007. It was proposed to be the location of a visitor center for the Marianas Trench Marine National Monument in 2010.

See also 
 Japanese Lighthouse (Poluwat, Chuuk), similar lighthouse in the Federated States of Micronesia
 List of lighthouses in the United States
 National Register of Historic Places listings in the Northern Mariana Islands

References

Sources 

  (and )

Lighthouses in insular areas of the United States
Buildings and structures in Saipan
Lighthouses completed in 1934
Lighthouses on the National Register of Historic Places
Buildings and structures on the National Register of Historic Places in the Northern Mariana Islands
World War II sites in the United States
World War II on the National Register of Historic Places in the Northern Mariana Islands
Garapan
1934 establishments in the Northern Mariana Islands